Shusha Realni School was a school with six classes, located in Shusha, Azerbaijan, in the disputed region of Nagorno-Karabakh. The school's building phase was completed in 1881. The school stopped its work following the capture of Shusha by Armenian forces in 1992 and now lies in a ruined state.

History

Establishment 
In the 19th century, new types of schools began to appear in the region that makes up modern-day Azerbaijan. During this period, there was only one main school in Baku, and one classical gymnasium in Ganja. This changed after the demand for education in the region grew, two schools were no longer sufficient thus prompting the population of the city to appeal to the Petersburg-Caucasian committee. The appeal stated:

The efforts of the local population led to the foundation of the school in Shusha on September 20, 1881. After the first years of the school's opening, 159 pupils were enrolled in the school, consisting of preparatory classes and three main classes, 58 of the students were Azerbaijani, 91 were Armenian, whilst the other 10 were students from other nationalities. In 1886, 7,500 manats were spent on the school.

19th and 20th centuries 
In 1890, a representative of the Caucasian Ministry of education brought Ziaaddovla Anishirəvan, Mirza Qajar, and anthropologist Shantr. This arrival piqued the interest of the students, which lowered the percentage of absence at the school to 7.64%. The school was an open-minded establishment which promoted the acquisition of languages other than Azerbaijani. In 1890, contrary to the Tbilisi schools, German was not forced upon the students, but the choice to learn it was made available.

Mirza Salah bey Zohrabbeyov, Yusif bey Malikhaqnazarov, Hashim bey Vazirov, were part of the well-known educators of the time, who taught in the School. The two famous Azerbaijani writers Abdurrahim bey Hagverdiyev and Yusif Vazir Chamanzaminli were amongst the students who enrolled at the Shusha Realni School.

Current status 
The state of the school has steadily deteriorated following the capture of Shusha by Armenian forces in 1992. It currently lies in a ruined state.

Gallery

See also 
 Monuments of Shusha

References 

Buildings and structures in Azerbaijan
School buildings completed in 1881